Genocide studies is an academic field of study that researches genocide. Genocide became a field of study in the mid-1940s, with the work of Raphael Lemkin, who coined genocide and started genocide research, and its primary subjects were the Armenian genocide and the Holocaust; the Holocaust was the primary subject matter of genocide studies, starting off as a side field of Holocaust studies, and the field received an extra impetus in the 1990s, when the Rwandan genocide occurred. It received further attraction in the 2010s through the formation of a gender field.

It is a complex field which has a lack of consensus on definition principles and has had a complex relationship with mainstream political science; it has enjoyed renewed research and interest in the last decades of the 20th century and the first decade of the 21st century. It remains a relevant yet minority school of thought that has not yet achieved mainstream status within political science.

History

Background 
The beginning of genocide research arose around the 1940s when Raphael Lemkin, a Polish-Jewish lawyer, began studying genocide. Known as the "father of the genocide convention", Lemkin invented the term genocide and studied it during World War II. In 1944, Lemkin's book Axis Rule introduced his idea of genocide, which he defined as "the destruction of a nation or ethnic group"; after his book was published, controversy broke out concerning the specific definition. Many scholars believed that genocide is naturally associated with mass murder, the Holocaust being the first case; there were also several other scholars who believed that genocide has a much broader definition and is not strictly tied to the Holocaust. In his book, Lemkin wrote that "physical and biological genocide are always preceded by cultural genocide or by an attack on the symbols of the group or violent interference of cultural activities." For Lemkin, genocide is the annihilation of a group's culture even if the group themselves are not completely destroyed.

1990s 
Starting off as a side field to Holocaust studies, several scholars continued Lemkin's genocide research, and the 1990s saw a strong growth in academic journals, such as the Genocide Studies and Prevention and the Journal of Genocide Research, within the field. The major reason for this increase in research can be traced back to the Rwandan genocide in the 1990s, which showed Western scholars the prevalence of genocide. Despite growth in the preceding decades, it remained a minority school of thought that developed in parallel to, rather than in conversation with, the work on other areas of political violence, and mainstream political scientists rarely engaged with the most recent work on comparative genocide studies. Such separation is complex but at least in part stems from its humanities roots and reliance on methodological approaches that did not convince mainstream political science; in addition, genocide studies are explicitly committed to humanitarian activism and praxis as a process, whereas the earlier generations of scholars who studied genocide did not find much interest among mainstream political science journals or book publishers, and decided to establish their own journals and organizations.

2000s 
In the 2000s, the field of comparative genocide studies lacked consensus on the definition of genocide, a typology (classification of genocide types), a comparative method of analysis, and on time frames. Anton Weiss-Wendt describe comparative genocide studies, which include an activist goal of preventing genocide, as having been a failure in genocide prevention.

2010s 
In the 2010s, genocide scholarship rarely appeared in mainstream disciplinary journals, despite growth in the amount of research.

Gender field 

In 2010, the study of genocide connected to gender was a new field of study and was considered as a specialty topic within the broader field of genocide research. The field attracted research attention after the genocides of Bosnia-Herzegovina and Rwanda, in which war crimes tribunals acknowledged that several women were raped and men were sexually abused. Feminist scholars study the differences between males and females during genocide by studying the lives of women survivors during the Holocaust. Similar research on the Armenian genocide has explored the representation of Armenian women as victims with specific focus on the film Ravished Armenia. These studies focus on the power of representations to disempower the object of the representation (as "the Armenian women"). Some scholars argue that representations of rape, when they become disempowering, can be viewed as acts of violence themselves.

See also 

 Outline of genocide studies
 Genocide education
 Genocide prevention

References

Footnotes

Bibliography

Further reading 
 
 

 
1940s introductions
Genocide education